In mathematics applied to computer graphics, nearest neighbor value interpolation is an advanced method of image interpolation. This method uses the pixel value corresponding to the smallest absolute difference when a set of four known value pixels has no mode. Proposed by Olivier Rukundo in 2012 in his PhD dissertation, the first work presented at the fourth International Workshop on Advanced Computational Intelligence, was based only on the pixel value corresponding to the smallest absolute difference to achieve high resolution and visually pleasant image. This approach was since upgraded to deal with a wider class of image interpolation artefacts which reduce the quality of image, and as a result, several future developments have emerged, drawing on various aspects of the pixel value corresponding to the smallest absolute difference.

References 

Multivariate interpolation